James Francis Hurley (born 1962) is an English convicted murderer and long-term fugitive from justice.

Hurley was driving the getaway car in an armed robbery in the town of Hemel Hempstead on the 14th of April 1988. During the robbery PC Frank Mason, who was off duty at the time and happened upon the security van robbery by chance whilst out walking, of the Hertfordshire Police was shot in the back by Hurley and later died of his injuries at West Hertfordshire Hospital. Hurley was convicted of PC Mason's murder in 1989, and sentenced to life imprisonment.

On the 16th of February 1994, whilst being transferred to Wandsworth Prison by bus, Hurley and another prisoner managed to escape. He fled the country and managed to remain at liberty for 13 years. On the 9th of November 2007, Hurley was apprehended by Dutch police during a raid on a suspected drug dealer at an address in The Hague, Netherlands.

He was sentenced to six years' imprisonment in the Netherlands
and paroled after four years. In November 2011, officers from the tactical team of Hertfordshire Constabulary extradited Hurley from the Netherlands and returned him to a London prison to serve his life sentence for the murder of PC Mason.

After being recaptured and imprisoned Hurley is now attempting to get his murder conviction overturned. On the 30th of July 2015, Hurley's appeal to have his conviction for the murder of PC Frank Mason quashed was heard at the Court of Appeal. A court date is yet to be set.

References

1962 births
Living people
English people convicted of murder
People convicted of murder by England and Wales
British people convicted of murdering police officers
Prisoners sentenced to life imprisonment by England and Wales
English escapees
Escapees from England and Wales detention
English prisoners sentenced to life imprisonment
Place of birth missing (living people)
British people imprisoned abroad
Prisoners and detainees of the Netherlands
People extradited from the Netherlands
People extradited to the United Kingdom